Thompson Point may refer to:
 Thompson Point (Antarctica)
 Thompson Point, Queensland, a locality in the Rockhampton Region, Queensland, Australia